Chris Tomlin & Friends is the thirteenth solo studio album by American contemporary Christian singer Chris Tomlin. The album was released via Sparrow Records and Capitol CMG on July 31, 2020. The album features guest appearances by Thomas Rhett, Florida Georgia Line, We the Kingdom, Lady A, Bear Rinehart, Needtobreathe, Brett Young, Cassadee Pope, Russell Dickerson, RaeLynn, Chris Lane, and Blessing Offor. Tomlin collaborated with Brian Kelley, Corey Crowder, Tyler Hubbard, Ed Cash, Dave Haywood, and David Garcia in handling the production of the album.

The album was supported by the release of "Who You Are to Me", "God Who Listens" and "Thank You Lord" as singles. "Who You Are to Me" peaked at No. 2 on the US Hot Christian Songs chart. "God Who Listens" peaked at No. 13 on the Hot Christian Songs chart. "Thank You Lord" peaked at No. 11 on the Hot Christian Songs chart.

Chris Tomlin & Friends drew mixed reactions from critics, and it was a commercially successful album upon its release, debuting at number one on Billboard's Top Christian Albums Chart and number six on Top Country Albums in the United States, and at number six on the Official Charts' Official Christian & Gospel Albums Chart in the United Kingdom. The album received a nomination for the GMA Dove Award Pop/Contemporary Album of the Year at the 2021 GMA Dove Awards.

Release and promotion

Singles
On July 10, 2020, "Who You Are to Me" featuring Lady A was impacted Christian radio in the United States as the lead single from the album. "Who You Are to Me" peaked at No. 2 on the US Hot Christian Songs chart.

On February 5, 2021, "God Who Listens" featuring Thomas Rhett was released as the second single from the album. "God Who Listens" peaked at No. 13 on the Hot Christian Songs chart.

On August 13, 2021, "Thank You Lord" featuring Thomas Rhett and Florida Georgia Line was impacted Christian radio in the United States as the third single from the album. "Thank You Lord" peaked at No. 11 on the Hot Christian Songs chart.

Promotional singles
On June 26, 2020, Chris Tomlin released "Thank You Lord" featuring Thomas Rhett and Florida Georgia Line, and "Who You Are to Me" featuring Lady A as the first two promotional singles from Chris Tomlin & Friends, being slated for release on July 31, 2020. On July 17, 2020, Tomlin released "Be the Moon" featuring Brett Young and Cassadee Pope as the third and final promotional single from the album.

Reception

Critical response

Joshua Andre in his 365 Days of Inspiring Media review opined that Chris Tomlin & Friends is "one album for the ages", further adding that "this album comes pretty close" to topping Arriving or Hello Love. CCM Magazine's Dan MacIntosh gave a favourable review of the album, saying "Chris Tomlin sounds like he really enjoyed making Christian music with his (mainly mainstream) friends. These friends also helped the worship music veteran make one of his best albums to date. These are good friends, indeed." Timothy Yap of JubileeCast gave a lacklustre review of the album, saying, "Though Asbury's previous record had that juggernaut hit "The downfall of this project is in two areas: while Tomlin is known for crafting anthems churches can sing to, there's not one of that calibre here. Second, though this record bears his name, Tomlin plays a subsidiary role as a vocalist. One gets the feeling that this doesn't really feel like a Chris Tomlin record." Rob Allwright, reviewing for One Man In The Middle, concluded: "The question has to be at the end of this, has the experiment worked? Sadly I think that overall it hasn't. The songs are easy to categorise into worship or country, there is not really any kind of blend of those genres. That's not to say that all of the songs, whether the worship numbers or the country one's are bad, but some of them are, despite the artists doing their best with them." Kelly Meade, indicating in a three-point-eight star review at Today's Christian Entertainment, said "When you push play on the Chris Tomlin & Friends album, you may be surprised, as I was, by who you’re hearing on some of these songs. However, a strong message of hope and trusting in God with a solid belief is woven throughout."

Reviewing for the Herald-Standard, Clint Rhodes said of the album: "With a little help from his friends, Tomlin is able to share a variety of testimonials on a compelling album about unwavering faith that encourages and transforms through a simplistic message of hope and salvation." In a NewReleaseToday review, Jasmin Patterson spoke of the album, saying "Chris Tomlin & Friends is an album that will appeal to fans of Christian music, country music and lovers of all genres. It's a significant project in that it brings Christian and mainstream artists together, not only to make music, but to share their faith with one another and with their audience."

Accolades

Commercial performance
In the United States, Chris Tomlin & Friends debuted at number one on the Billboard Top Christian Albums chart, having earned 12,000 equivalent album units in the first week of sales. The album is Chris Tomlin's eighth chart-topping release on the Top Christian Albums chart, following Never Lose Sight (2016). Chris Tomlin & Friends launched at number six on the OCC's Official Christian & Gospel Albums Chart in the United Kingdom, in the week ending August 13, 2020.

Track listing

Personnel
Credits adapted from Tidal.
 Adam Ayan — mastering engineer 
 Ed Cash — producer 
 David Cook — mixing assistant 
 Corey Crowder — producer 
 Russell Dickerson — featured artist, vocals 
 Florida Georgia Line — featured artist, vocals 
 David Garcia — producer 
 Dave Haywood — producer 
 Tyler Hubbard — producer 
 Jeff Juliano — mixing 
 Brian Kelley — producer 
 Lady A — featured artist, vocals 
 Chris Lane — featured artist, vocals 
 Needtobreathe — featured artist 
 Blessing Offor — featured artist, vocals 
 Cassadee Pope — featured artist, vocals 
 RaeLynn — featured artist, vocals 
 Thomas Rhett — featured artist, vocals 
 Bear Rinehart — featured artist, vocals 
 Chris Tomlin — primary artist , producer 
 We the Kingdom — featured artist, vocals 
 Brett Young — featured artist, vocals

Charts

Weekly charts

Year-end charts

Release history

References

External links
 

2020 albums
Chris Tomlin albums
Sparrow Records albums